Oleg was the 4th and final  protected cruiser built for the Imperial Russian Navy.

Operational history
Oleg was laid down at the Admiralty Shipyards at St. Petersburg on 6 July 1902, launched on 14 August 1903 and commissioned into the Russian Baltic Fleet on 24 June 1904. With the Russo-Japanese War already in progress, she was seconded to the Russian Second Pacific Squadron.

Russo-Japanese War

Under the command of Admiral Oskar Enkvist, Oleg was part of the Russian Second Pacific Squadron, which sailed from the Baltic Sea around the world to relieve the Japanese blockade of the Russian Pacific Fleet at Port Arthur during the Russo-Japanese War. The squadron engaged Japanese Admiral Togo Heihachiro’s Combined Fleet at the Battle of Tsushima on 15 May 1905. During the battle, Oleg was damaged, but managed to escape and, together with the cruisers  and  reached the protection of the neutral port of Manila, where she was interned to the end of the war.

After returning to the Russian Baltic Fleet, Oleg was refitted and her torpedo nets removed.) On 27 September 1908, she ran aground off Cronstadt. She was refloated on 4 October with assistance from the tugs Forwards, Meteor and Vladimir. She was taken in to Cronstadt for repairs, which were completed in December.

World War I
At the start of World War I, Oleg was part of the Russian 1st Cruiser Brigade in the Baltic Sea. On 26 August 1914, together with sister ship , she covered minelaying operations in the Baltic, as well as laying mines herself.

On 2 July 1915, Oleg participated in the Battle of Åland Islands during which she assisted in driving the German light cruiser  onto the beach.

In June 1916, the Russian Baltic Fleet launched a major offensive against German convoys off the Swedish cost, near Gotland.

Russian Revolution
During the October Revolution of 1917, the crew of Oleg quickly declared support for the Bolshevik cause. The Treaty of Brest-Litovsk required the Soviets to evacuate their base at Helsinki in March 1918 or have their ships interned by newly independent Finland even though the Gulf of Finland was still frozen over. Oleg sailed to Kronstadt in what became known as the 'Ice Voyage'. In November 1918, Oleg and Bogatyr participated in the aborted invasion of Estonia by the Red Army. Oleg was torpedoed and sunk on the night of 17 June 1919 by Royal Navy speedboat CMB-4 commanded by Captain Augustus Agar in an attack on the Red Navy facilities at Kronstadt. Parts of the ship were salvaged in 1919 and 1933, and the rest of hulk was raised and scrapped in 1938.

References

 

World War I cruisers of Russia
Naval ships of Russia
1904 ships
Ships built at Admiralty Shipyard
Bogatyr-class cruisers
Russo-Japanese War cruisers of Russia
Maritime incidents in 1908
Maritime incidents in 1919